Freddie Miller ( - 20 July 1960) was a professional rugby league footballer who played in the 1930s, 1940s and 1950s. He played at club level for Hull F.C. and Featherstone Rovers (Heritage № 314), as a right-footed toe-end style (rather than round the corner style) goal-kicking , i.e. number 1, and was captain of Hull during the 1946–47 season.

Playing career

Challenge Cup Final appearances
Freddie Miller played  in Featherstone Rovers' 10-18 defeat by Workington Town in the 1952 Challenge Cup Final during the 1951–52 season at Wembley Stadium, London on Saturday 19 April 1952, in front of a crowd of 72,093.

County Cup Final appearances
Freddie Miller played  in Hull FC's 10-18 defeat by Huddersfield in the 1938 Yorkshire County Cup Final during the 1938–39 season at Odsal Stadium, Bradford on Saturday 22 October 1938.

Playing career
Freddie Miller was transferred from Hull F.C. to the Featherstone Rovers for £200 during January 1920, he made his début for the Featherstone Rovers on Saturday 21 January 1950, he played his last match for the Featherstone Rovers during the 1952–53 season, he appears to have scored no drop-goals (or field-goals as they are currently known in Australasia), but prior to the 1974–75 season all goals, whether; conversions, penalties, or drop-goals, scored 2-points, consequently prior to this date drop-goals were often not explicitly documented, therefore '0' drop-goals may indicate drop-goals not recorded, rather than no drop-goals scored. In addition, prior to the 1949–50 season, the archaic field-goal was also still a valid means of scoring points.

Honoured at Featherstone Rovers
Freddie Miller is a Featherstone Rovers Hall of Fame inductee.

References

External links
Search for "Miller" at rugbyleagueproject.org
 (archived by web.archive.org) Stats → PastPlayers → M at hullfc.com
 (archived by web.archive.org) Statistics at hullfc.com

Featherstone Rovers players
Hull F.C. captains
Hull F.C. players
Rugby league fullbacks
English rugby league players
1910s births
1960 deaths
Year of birth uncertain
Place of birth missing
Place of death missing